Helmut Kronsbein (25 December 1914 – 27 March 1991) was a German football striker and later manager.

References

1914 births
1991 deaths
Sportspeople from Gdańsk
German footballers
Arminia Bielefeld players
1. FC Köln players
SSV Ulm 1846 players
Association football forwards
German football managers
SSV Ulm 1846 managers
Hannover 96 managers
MSV Duisburg managers
Alemannia Aachen managers
VfR Mannheim managers
Hertha BSC managers